Sean Enoch Tembo (born 30 March 1980) is a Zambian politician, certified accountant and president of the Patriots For Economic Progress political party. He participated in the 2021 presidential elections where he came out number thirteen out of sixteen candidates with a total of 1,813 votes representing 0.04%.

Early life and career
Tembo was born in 1980 in Chipata's Jabu Village Eastern Province of Zambia. He attended his primary school in Lusaka at Chitukuko Primary School and his junior secondary education Kabulonga School and completed his senior secondary school education in 1997 at Hillcrest Technical Secondary School. He is a holder of a bachelor's degree in Accountancy obtained from the Copperbelt university He is also a holder of a master's degree in Business Administration obtained from University of Derby. He is the founder of Enosyst Associates an audit & business advisory services firm. He has also served as Assistant Superintendent of the Zambia Police Service. Tembo is currently the president of the opposition political party Patriots for Economic Progress Party.

Personal life
Tembo is married to Lorrita Kabwe, a Consultant Cardiologist at the University Teaching Hospital.

References

External links 

 Sean E. Tembo on Facebook
 

1980 births
Living people
Zambian accountants
Zambian businesspeople
Copperbelt University alumni
Alumni of the University of Derby
People from Chipata District